Ichabod Bartlett (July 24, 1786 – October 19, 1853) was an American politician and a United States representative from New Hampshire.

Early life
Bartlett was born in Salisbury, New Hampshire on July 24, 1786. He received a classical education and graduated from Dartmouth College in Hanover in 1808. He studied law and was admitted to the bar in 1811, commencing practice in Durham.

Career
Bartlett moved to Portsmouth in 1816 and continued the practice of law. He was the clerk of the New Hampshire Senate in 1817 and 1818, and served as the state solicitor for Rockingham County 1819-1821. In addition, he was a member of the New Hampshire House of Representatives 1819-1821 and served as speaker in 1821.

Elected as an Adams-Clay Republican to the Eighteenth Congress and as an Adams to the Nineteenth and Twentieth Congresses, Bartlett served as United States Representative from (March 4, 1823 – March 3, 1829). He declined the appointment as chief justice of the court of common pleas in 1825 and was again a member of the New Hampshire House of Representatives 1830, 1838, 1851, and 1852. Failing in a bid for the governorship of New Hampshire in 1832, he served as a member of the state constitutional convention in 1850.

Death
Bartlett was never married and died in Portsmouth, New Hampshire on October 19, 1853 (age 67 years, 87 days). He is interred at Harmony Grove Cemetery, Portsmouth, New Hampshire.

References

External links

1786 births
1853 deaths
People from Salisbury, New Hampshire
American people of English descent
Democratic-Republican Party members of the United States House of Representatives from New Hampshire
National Republican Party members of the United States House of Representatives from New Hampshire
Speakers of the New Hampshire House of Representatives
Members of the New Hampshire House of Representatives
New Hampshire state senators
Dartmouth College alumni
Burials in New Hampshire